Isidro Santiago Rodriguez Sr. (May 15, 1915 – March 9, 1992) was a Filipino softball official and politician. Rodriguez was the first Vice President of the International Softball Federation (ISF) and an ISF Hall of Fame inductee. He is the son of Eulogio "Amang" Rodriguez Sr., former Senate President of the Philippines, and Juana Santiago Rodriguez.

Education
Rodriguez obtained his law degree from the University of the Philippines.

Softball
Rodriguez is dubbed as the "Father of Softball in the Philippines" by many softball enthusiasts in the country. He was President of the Amateur Softball Association of the Philippines from 1969 to 1983. He served as first Vice President of the ISF. He has also organized the ASEAN Softball Federation in 1975. Rodriguez was inducted in the ISF Hall of Fame in 1983.

Political career

From 1955 to 1986, Rodriguez served as the Provincial Governor of Rizal. He has never lost in an election. He is cited for establishing the Manggahan Floodway and Parañaque spillway which alleviated flooding problem in Metro Manila. He was also instrumental in conceiving the Laguna Lake Developmental Plan which calls for sustainable development in the Laguna de Bay area and was supported by both the national government and the United Nations. He also developed healthcare in his constituent province and set up health and puericulture centers in Rizal, including the first provincial blood bank in the country. Rodriguez also conceptualized first Youth Development Program through the Rizal Youth Development Foundation. The youth program later served as a basis for the Kabataang Barangay or the National Development Youth Program.

Rodriguez served for four consecutive terms both at the League of Provincial Governors and League of City Mayors of the Philippines. He served as the first chairman of the Pambansang Kapulungan ng mga Sangguniang Bayan (Assembly of the National Board). He was also appointed as the chairman of the Constitutional Convention committee on power functions and structures during the 1971 Constitution.

Rodriguez was also the first chairman of the Nationalist People's Coalition.

Personal life 
Rodriguez is the son of the late senator Eulogio Rodriguez.

In 1941, he married future mayor of Quezon City Adelina Santos and they have 10 children including Isidro Jr. and Adelina.

Isidro Jr. or Jun is a former member of Philippine House of Representatives representing the second district of Rizal from 1998-2007 and again from 2010-2019 and Adelina Rodriguez Zaldarriaga or Deline also served as House member from the same district from 2007 to 2010.

Death
Rodriguez died due to heart failure while being confined at the National Kidney and Transplant Institute on March 9, 1992.

References

1992 deaths
Nationalist People's Coalition politicians
Governors of Rizal
20th-century Filipino lawyers
University of the Philippines alumni
Nacionalista Party politicians
1915 births